David Wright (born 16 March 1951) was an Australian professional rugby league footballer of the 1970s. A Queensland state and Australia national representative forward, he played in the Brisbane Rugby League for the Brothers club and in England's Northern Rugby Football League for the Warrington club.

Wright was born on 16 March 1951. He started playing football in the Brisbane Rugby League with the Brothers club. In July 1973 Wright was first selected to play for Queensland in the series against New South Wales. After then winning Channel 7’s best player award for the 1973 season he earned an off-season stint with English club, Warrington, becoming player number 748. In February 1974 Wright played in Warrington's victory in the 1973–74 League Cup Final. In May 1974 Wright played at Wembley Stadium in London for Warrington in the final of the 1973–74 Challenge Cup, in which they defeated Featherstone Rovers 24-9. After Wembley, he was to come back to Brisbane to play the rest of the season with Brothers, who had a new boss, Paul Broughton. 

In January 1975 Wright played in Warrington's victory in the final of the 1974–75 BBC2 Floodlit Trophy. In June 1975 while still playing for Brothers Wright was first selected to play for the Australian national team in the 1975 Rugby League World Cup against New Zealand, becoming Kangaroo No. 484. In 1976 Wright was selected in all three of Queensland's matches against New South Wales.

References

1951 births
Living people
Australia national rugby league team players
Australian rugby league players
Past Brothers players
Queensland rugby league team players
Rugby league players from Queensland
Warrington Wolves players